Pachybathron cypraeoides is a species of sea snail, a marine gastropod mollusk, in the family Cystiscidae.

References

cypraeoides
Gastropods described in 1845
Cystiscidae